Mors-Thy Håndbold  is a handball club, based in Nykøbing Mors and Thisted, Denmark. Currently, Mors-Thy Håndbold competes in the men's Danish Handball League. The home arena of the team is Sparekassen Thy Arena and Thyhallen in Thisted.

History
The newborn club was founded in 2007, when HF Mors and Thisted IK merged their first teams to create the new club.

Honours
Danish Handball Cup: 1
: 2020

Team

Staff
Staff for the 2020-21 season

Current squad
Squad for the 2022-23 season

Goalkeeper
 1  Rasmus Nissen Henriksen
 16  Lasse Vuust
 30  Svend Rughave
Wingers
LW
 25  Magnus Norlyk
 66  Frederik Bjerre
RW
 11  Lasse Pedersen (c)
 21  Tim Sørensen
Pivots
 4  Kasper Lindgren (c)
 13  Andreas Johann Nielsen
 22  Axel Franzén

Back players
LB
 6  Mads Thymann
 7  Johan Nilsson 
 23  Marcus Midtgaard
 29  Marcus Norrbrink
CB
 10  Mads Svane
 18  Kristian Lund Vukman
 19  Victor Norlyk
RB
 9  Nicolaj Kjær Spanggaard
 27  Oscar von Oettingen

Transfers
Transfers for the 2023-24 season

Joining
  Henrik Tilsted (LW) (from  Bjerringbro-Silkeborg Håndbold)
  Frederik Tilsted (CB) (from  TTH Holstebro)
  Malthe Bull (RW) (from own rows)
  Henrik Toft Hansen (P) (from  Paris Saint-Germain Handball)
  Kasper Didriksen (P) (from  HC Midtjylland)

Leaving
  Lasse Vuust (GK)
  Frederik Bjerre (LW) (to  TTH Holstebro)
  Tim Sørensen (RW) (retires)
  Andreas Johann Nielsen (P)
  Axel Franzén (P) (to  Ribe-Esbjerg HH)

Kit manufacturers
 Hummel

References

Danish handball clubs